is a former Japanese football player. She played for Japan national team.

Club career
Izumi was born in Tokyo on 31 May 1975. In 1989, she joined Shinko Seiko FC Clair (later Tokyo Shidax LSC). In 1989 season, she was selected Young Player Awards. However, the club was disbanded in 1995. So, she moved to Suzuyo Shimizu FC Lovely Ladies. In 1998 season, she played 18 games and scored 21 goals. She became top scorer. However, the club was withdrew the L.League. So, in 1999, she moved to NTV Beleza (later Nippon TV Beleza). She retired end of 2006 season. She was also selected Best Eleven 2 times (1998 and 1999).

National team career
On 16 May 1996, Izumi debuted for Japan national team against United States. She was a member of Japan for 1996 Summer Olympics. She played 5 games for Japan in 1996.

National team statistics

References

External links
 

 

1975 births
Living people
Association football people from Tokyo
Japanese women's footballers
Japan women's international footballers
Nadeshiko League players
Tokyo Shidax LSC players
Suzuyo Shimizu FC Lovely Ladies players
Nippon TV Tokyo Verdy Beleza players
Olympic footballers of Japan
Footballers at the 1996 Summer Olympics
Women's association football forwards